Men's 7.5 km biathlon events at the 2006 Winter Paralympics were contested at Pragelato on 11 March.

There were 3 events. Standings were decided by applying a disability factor to the actual times achieved; for each missed shot the competitors had to execute one 150m penalty loop, which was included in the real time.

Visually impaired

The visually impaired event was won by Irek Mannanov, representing .

Sitting

The sitting event was won by Vladimir Kiselev, representing .

Standing

The standing event was won by Rustam Garifoullin, representing .

References

M